Porpocera is a genus of flies in the family Stratiomyidae.

Species
Porpocera fibulata Enderlein, 1914
Porpocera horrida Lindner, 1958

References

Stratiomyidae
Brachycera genera
Taxa named by Günther Enderlein
Diptera of Africa